The 20th Secretariat of the Communist Party of the Soviet Union was elected by the 20th Central Committee in the aftermath of the 20th Congress.

List of members

References

Secretariat of the Central Committee of the Communist Party of the Soviet Union members
1956 establishments in the Soviet Union
1961 disestablishments in the Soviet Union